Hieracium rigorosum, a name for a plant in the hawkweed genus Hieracium, has been identified as synonyms of two different species:

Hieracium canadense
Hieracium laevigatum

References 

rigorosum